The Whau Local Board is one of the 21 local boards of the Auckland Council. It is the only local board overseen by the council's Whau Ward councillor.

The Whau board, named after the Whau River estuary which runs through the board area, covers the suburbs of Avondale, Blockhouse Bay, Green Bay, Kelston, New Lynn and New Windsor.

The board consists of seven members elected at large. The inaugural members were elected in the nationwide 2010 local elections, coinciding with the introduction of the Auckland Council.

Demographics

2022–2025 term
The board's term currently runs from the 2022 local body elections to the local body elections in 2025. The current board members are:
 Kay Thomas (chair)
 Fasitua Amosa (deputy chair)
 Susan Zhu
 Catherine Farmer
 Warren Piper
 Sarah Paterson-Hamlin
 Ross Clow

2019–2022 term
The board's term from the 2019 local body elections to the local body elections in 2022. The board members are:
 Kay Thomas (chair)
 Susan Zhu (deputy chair)
 Catherine Farmer
 Warren Piper
 Fasitua Amosa 
 Ulalemamae Te'eva Matafai
 Jessica Rose

References

Whau Local Board Area
Local boards of the Auckland Region
West Auckland, New Zealand